Alto Dairy Cooperative (ADC) was a farmer-owned dairy cooperative in Waupun, Wisconsin. Founded in 1894, it is the oldest farmer-owned cooperative in the state of Wisconsin and boasts the nation's largest cheese producing plant east of the Mississippi River. As of 2007, ADC had two cheese plants, one in Black Creek and one in Waupun, as well as 467 employees. The cooperative has a membership of about 500 farmers. In 2007, it handled $378 million in sales and had a net income of $19.6 million.

Sale of Alto Dairy
In 2008, Alto Dairy Cooperative was sold to Saputo Inc., a Canadian cheese company. Alto Dairy still operates under its original name as a subsidiary. This sale was approved by 98% of the farmers who are active in the cooperative, allowing Saputo Cheese USA, Inc. to purchase the dairy cooperative for $160 million.

Notable achievements
In 2007, ADC appeared on the History channel series Modern Marvels. The show interviewed employees and filmed the production process at the Black Creek cheese plant, chosen for its diverse cheese-making abilities. Alto Dairy Colby-Jack cheese won an award at the World Championship Cheese and butter contest in 2006 and 2008. The prize-winning cheese was from the Black Creek cheese plant.

References

Companies based in Wisconsin
Dairy products companies of the United States
Fond du Lac County, Wisconsin
Dairy cooperatives
Agricultural cooperatives in the United States